Dominik Kunca (born 4 March 1992) is a Slovak professional footballer who plays as a forward.

Club career

Zemplín Michalovce
After beginning his career with ŠK Strážske, he moved to MFK Zemplín Michalovce. He made his debut for Zemplín at the age of sixteen, two months and 13 days against Inter Bratislava in Piešťany on 17 May 2008.

ŽP Šport Podbrezová
In summer 2014, he came to Podbrezová on a half-year loan from MFK Zemplín Michalovce. 
He made his professional debut for ŽP Šport Podbrezová against Slovan Bratislava in a 2:1 loss on 11 July 2014.

Motor Lublin
On 6 August 2019, he signed a contract with Motor Lublin. After returning from a loan spell at Avia Świdnik at the end of June 2022, his contract with Motor was not extended and he left the club.

References

External links
 
 ŽP Šport Podbrezová profile
 Eurofotbal profile

1992 births
Living people
Sportspeople from Humenné
Slovak footballers
Slovak expatriate footballers
Association football forwards
MFK Zemplín Michalovce players
FK Železiarne Podbrezová players
MFK Ružomberok players
1. SC Znojmo players
Motor Lublin players
Avia Świdnik players
Slovak Super Liga players
2. Liga (Slovakia) players
III liga players
II liga players
Czech National Football League players
Slovak expatriate sportspeople in the Czech Republic
Slovak expatriate sportspeople in Poland
Expatriate footballers in the Czech Republic
Expatriate footballers in Poland